"Navy Blue" is the single by Japanese singer-songwriter Rina Aiuchi. It was released on 3 October 2001 through Giza Studio, as the third single from her second studio album Power of Words. The song served as the theme song to the Japanese television show Wonderful. The song has sold 127,390 copies nationwide and remains as Aiuchi's best-selling single.

Commercial performance
"Navy Blue" reached at number two on the Oricon Weekly Singles Chart, selling 127,390 physical copies.

Track listing

Charts

Certification and sales

|-
! scope="row"| Japan (RIAJ)
| 
| 127,390
|-
|}

Release history

References

2001 singles
2001 songs
J-pop songs
Song recordings produced by Daiko Nagato
Songs written by Rina Aiuchi
Songs written by Daria Kawashima